Rhoda S. Jacobs (born September 29, 1936) is an American politician from New York. A Democrat, she was until 2014 a member of the New York State Assembly from the 42nd Assembly District in Brooklyn, which primarily includes the neighborhoods of Flatbush, Brooklyn and Midwood.

A Brooklyn native and a graduate of Brooklyn College, Assemblywoman Jacobs was originally elected to the then 43rd District in 1978.  Jacobs faced a difficult re-election in 1982 after the Assembly districts were re-apportioned to increase African-American and Hispanic representation in the Legislature. Jacobs ended up in the new 42nd District where she prevailed and remained there until 2014, sitting in the 183rd, 184th, 185th, 186th, 187th, 188th, 189th, 190th, 191st, 192nd, 193rd, 194th, 195th, 196th, 197th, 198th, 199th and 200th New York State Legislatures.

She served at times as the Assistant Speaker of the New York State Assembly, as Assistant Speaker pro tempore and Chairwoman of the Majority Program Committee as well as the Social Services Committee, which latter positions she occupied for two and twelve years respectively.

In the past, she has also served as the Chair of the Assembly Committee on Oversight, Analysis and Investigation and the Task Force on Food, Farm and Nutrition Policy. In 1997, Jacobs was appointed as Chairwoman of the Budget Conference Committee on Health and Human Services.

In addition to these positions within the Assembly, she has also served as an officer for the National Association of State Legislators and as an elected delegate to other national legislative bodies.

References

External links
Gotham Gazette's Eye On Albany: New York State Assembly: District 42

Politicians from Brooklyn
Democratic Party members of the New York State Assembly
Jewish American state legislators in New York (state)
Women state legislators in New York (state)
21st-century American politicians
21st-century American women politicians
Brooklyn College alumni
Living people
1936 births
21st-century American Jews